The Battle of Sjenica was a battle between attacking forces of Yugoslav Partisans on one side and defending forces of the Sandžak Muslim militia and town's militsiya (Serbs and Muslims) in Sjenica, on the territory of the Italian governorate of Montenegro.

Background 

At the beginning of the Second World War the territory of Sandžak was a subject of territorial aspirations of all sides in the war. The Muslims wanted this region to be annexed to the Ustaše controlled Independent State of Croatia which pursued a genocidal policy toward Serbs, Jews and Roma People. On the other hand, the Germans designated it to be a part of their occupation zone, Italians wanted to control all of Sandžak while Albanians wanted it to be annexed to their Greater Albania. The Chetniks and Partisans struggled to keep Sandžak within Yugoslavia. Based on the agreement of July 1941, Sjenica was included in the Italian governorate of Montenegro.

Hasan Zvizdić was a wealthy Muslim whole-trader in Sjenica. He became a city governor and armed many local Muslims and organized them as militia during the war. In December 1941 Zvizdić refused to allow Partisans to capture Sjenica because he was afraid that Chetniks, German and Italian forces would attack Partisans in Sjenica and kill many of its population as well. He explained to Partisans that he has around 5,000 members of Muslim militia under his command and that he will used them against Partisans or Chetniks if they try to capture Sjenica. According to historian Živković, Zvizdić was actually concerned that his lucrative contracts to supply Italian and German army with livestock would be cancelled if Partisans capture the city.

Armed forces 

The Partisan military units that attacked the town belonged to the 2nd Takovo Company commanded by Tadija Andrić, part of the Belgrade Company and part of the Serbian-Sandžak Company commanded by Vladimir Knežević and Petar Stambolić. The staff of the Belgrade Company was against the attack on Sjenica, but was outvoted.

On 23 November the Partisans captured and executed several Chetnik commanders near Nova Varoš. This action compromised the Partisans in the eyes of many Serbs from Sjenica who developed animosity toward them. As a result, many Serbs from Sjenica joined forces of the town's militsiya to defend the town from the Partisans.

Battle 

The attack on Sjenica began on 22 December 1941, in 4:30 a.m. The Partisans attacked the town from three directions. Initially, the Belgrade company managed to penetrate the town and capture its center. The Partisans faced with strong gunfire in period between 8 and 10 a.m. and even hot water thrown at them from the windows of the houses. The Belgrade company managed to retreat from the town only after 11 a.m. and reached Nova Varoš only on 23 December because they were carrying four heavily wounded Partisans.

The remaining two groups failed to fulfill their tasks because they were easily repelled back to the town's periphery. On the same day the forces of Muslim militia from Prijepolje, commanded by Pačariz, and from Sjenica commanded by Zvizdić successfully repelled the attack of Partisans who tried to capture Sjenica. They were supported by one company from German controlled Tutin, commanded by Džemail Koničanin, who joined them based on invitation of Zvizdić.

Communist casualties included Andrija Tadić, the commander of the 2nd Takovo company.

Aftermath 
Josip Broz Tito criticized Partisan attack on Sjenica which, according to his position, was against direct order of the supreme command and Communist Party. Belgrade battalion lost third of its manpower and Priboj and Sjenica companies ceased to exist in the battle. Another defeat shock already low morale among Partisans in the area. Because of the attack on Sjenica in early 1942 Italians closed the border on relation Plav-Rožaje-Tutin and armed part of local Muslim population in the area. Prisoners of war were captured in Sjenica until February 1942, when Zvizdić sent, on Italian orders, 23 of prisoners to Prijepolje. Pačariz and his men escorted them to there. They were in light clothes, so a few of them lost limbs from freezing. Some of prisoners were women, who were tortured and raped. Four of prisoners were exchanged with Partisans, two were bought by Pačariz and other 17 were executed by Italians in Prijepolje.

References

Sources 
 
 
 
 

Sjenica 1941
Sjenica 1941
Sjenica 1941
Sjenica
December 1941 events
History of Sandžak